Christmas in Concert  is a Christmas-themed album of music performed live by American singer-songwriter John Denver. It was recorded at DAR Constitution Hall on December 19 and 20, 1996, and released in September 2001 by RCA Records. It features the World Children's Choir directed by Sondra Harnes, and the National Symphony Orchestra conducted by Richard Kaufman.

Track listing

 "Christmas for Cowboys"
 "Christmas, Like a Lullaby"
 "The Marvelous Toy"
 "Good Evening Talk"
 "A Baby Just Like You"  
 "Rudolph the Red Nosed Reindeer"  
 "Choir Intro"  
 "Away in a Manger"  
 "Jingle Bells"  
 "What Child Is This?"  
 "Intro to Please Daddy (Don't Get Drunk This Christmas)"  
 "Please Daddy (Don't Get Drunk This Christmas)"  
 "Intro to Alfie/The Christmas Tree" 
 "Alfie / The Christmas Tree"  
 "Silent Night"  
 "Living Legend Story"  
 "Noel-Christmas Eve 1913"  
 "Little Drummer Boy"  
 "O Holy Night"  
 "Take Me Home, Country Roads"  
 "Annie's Song"  
 "Calypso"  
 "Intro to Falling Leaves (The Refugees)"  
 "Falling Leaves (The Refugees)"

Personnel
John Denver – guitars, vocals
Alan Deremo – bass
Sondra Harnes – choir director
Pete Huttlinger – guitar, mandolin, banjo, harmonica, backing vocals
Richard Kaufman – orchestra conductor
Chris Nole – piano, accordion, synthesizer
Michito Sanchez – percussion
National Symphony Orchestra – orchestra
World Children's Choir – choir

Chart performance

2001 live albums
Live Christmas albums
Christmas albums by American artists
John Denver albums
RCA Records live albums